The  April 2014 Nicaragua earthquake  occurred on April 10 at . The shock measured 6.1 on the moment magnitude scale and had a maximum Mercalli intensity of VI (Strong).

The earthquake resulted in the death of one person and 266 injured. Over 1,500 houses were damaged, and tremors continued for many hours afterwards. The town of Nagarote and nearby villages in the León Region were the most affected by the earthquake. 

In less than a day, another earthquake hit Nicaragua, this time near the city of Granada, at 3:29 local time. The second quake registered at a 6.6 magnitude, however, it did not result in any casualties.

See also
 List of earthquakes in 2014
 List of earthquakes in Nicaragua
 Economy of Nicaragua
 Tourism in Nicaragua
 Types of earthquake

References

Earthquakes in Nicaragua
2014 earthquakes
2014 in Nicaragua
Managua
April 2014 events in North America